3D Entertainment Film Holdings is a producer and distributor of 3D films for IMAX and digital 3D theatrical exhibition through its divisions 3D Entertainment Films, which produces films, and 3D Entertainment Distribution, which handles theatrical sales and marketing.

The studio hasn't released anything since 2015, and are currently on hiatus, unknown if they'll ever close down and be folded into IMAX Filmed Entertainment or not, and with two films still in production. The company has offices in London, Los Angeles, and Paris.

Films

Upcoming

References 

3D imaging
IMAX
Film distributors of the United Kingdom
Mass media companies established in 2001